SLAF Diyatalawa is the Sri Lanka Air Force station in Diyatalawa. It is the primary ground combat training centre for SLAF Regiment and other trades. It runs basic combat courses for officer cadets and recruits as well as Advanced training for SLAF Regiment officer cadets. Gunner instructor technique course, drill instructor technique course and physical training instructor course are carried out here.

The Royal Ceylon Air Force first established a detachment in the garrison town of Diyatalawa on 15 October 1952, at the Stable Hill Camp as a Ground Combat and Recruit Training Unit, with seconded RAF officer in command. In 1953 McReberts Camp was taken over by the RCyAF from the RAF.

References

External links
SLAF Diyatalawa

Sri Lanka Air Force bases
Diyatalawa
Buildings and structures in Badulla District